Kenar Rud Rural District is in Bala Taleqan District of Taleqan County, Alborz province, Iran. At the latest census in 2016, the population was 3,146 people in 1,183 households. The largest of its 16 villages is Vashteh, with 593 inhabitants.

At the time of the 2006 census (prior to the formation of the rural district in Taleqan County), its constituent villages were in the former Taleqan District of Savojbolagh County, Tehran province. Their total population was 3,973.

References 

Taleqan County

Rural Districts of Alborz Province

Populated places in Alborz Province

Populated places in Taleqan County

fa:دهستان کنار رود